= Why Me & Sherry's House =

Why Me & Sherry's House is a grass roots non-profit organization based in Worcester, Massachusetts, that supports families facing childhood cancer. Founded in 1985, Why Me provides comprehensive, family-centered assistance to help reduce the financial, emotional, and practical burdens associated with a child's diagnosis. Its services include but not limited to emergency financial assistance, family programming, peer support, and lodging at Sherry's House - their 8 bedroom residence. Why Me receives no state or federal funding and provides cost-free services.

== History ==
Why Me (Worcester Help for Youth, Memories Everlasting) was conceived and founded by Sherry Shepherd, who was diagnosed with cancer at age 9 and spent four years in treatment. During her illness, Sherry was known for her optimism, creativity, and compassion, often writing poetry and finding ways to lift the spirits of other children undergoing cancer treatment.

Sherry was the first pediatric oncology patient treated at the University of Massachusetts Medical Center. While receiving care, she became acutely aware of the emotional and practical hardships faced not only by children with cancer but also by their families. Even as she battled her own illness, she focused on supporting fellow patients and easing their suffering, becoming a source of inspiration to children, families, and care teams alike.

In the final months of her life, Sherry expressed a strong desire to create something of lasting value for children with cancer in her community. With the support of her father, Terry Shepherd, she helped establish Why Me & Sherry’s House, a nonprofit organization dedicated to providing practical and financial assistance to families facing childhood cancer. The organization’s name reflects its mission: Worcester Help for Youth, Memories Everlasting, honoring Sherry’s vision and enduring legacy.

=== Sherry’s House ===
Sherry’s House is a residential hospitality home in Worcester, Massachusetts, operated by Why Me. The facility opened in 2004 and provides temporary housing at no cost to families whose children are undergoing cancer treatment at a New England area hospital, allowing them to remain close to their child’s medical care while reducing the financial and emotional strain associated with extended hospital stays.

Named in memory of Sherry Shepherd, Sherry’s House is a central component of Why Me’s continuum of services. The organization’s administrative offices are located within Sherry’s House, which also serves as the primary hub for family-centered programming. Events and services hosted at the house include family fun events, summer camp programming, and support groups, creating a consistent, supportive environment for families throughout diagnosis, treatment, and survivorship.
